Amor y Rock And Roll (English: Love and Rock n' Roll) is the second studio album by Mexican pop singer Mijares. This album was released in 1987. Once again Mijares looked for his previous producer Miguel Blasco. He worked again with the songwriters José Ramón Florez, Hernaldo Zúñiga, Gian Pietro Felisatti and besides Pablo Pinilla.

Track listing

Lp Album
Tracks:
 No se murió el amor - 3:55
 Solamente un hombre - 3:23
 El rey de la noche - 3:20
 El amor no tiene fronteras - 3:19
 Baila en los pasillos - 3:03
 Amor y Rock and Roll - 2:53
 Mónica - 3:06
 Un montón de verano - 3:11
 Corazones rebeldes - 3:20
 Corredor de fondo - 3:18
 Poco a poco (Bonus track) - 3:33

Bonus Track
"Poco a poco" (Little by little) originally belongs to the previous album, but it was taken away and replaced by the song "Soñador" (Dreamer).  The producer decided to include it here and release it as a single.

Singles
 No se murió el amor
 El amor no tiene fronteras
 El rey de la noche
 Poco a poco

Single Charts

References

1987 albums
Manuel Mijares albums